Netherlands competed at the 1968 Summer Paralympics in Tel Aviv, Israel. The team included 35 athletes, 24 men and 11 women. Competitors from Netherlands won 20 medals, including 12 gold, 4 silver and 4 bronze to finish 8th in the medal table.

Medalists

Source: www.paralympic.org & www.olympischstadion.nl

See also
Netherlands at the Paralympics
Netherlands at the 1968 Summer Olympics

References 

Nations at the 1968 Summer Paralympics
1968
Summer Paralympics